The Raven Inn is a former pub at 140 Westbridge Road, Battersea, London SW11. It was a pub until at least 2009, but is now Melanzana, an Italian restaurant.

It is a Grade II listed building, dating back to the late 17th century.

References

Grade II listed pubs in London
Former pubs in London
Grade II listed buildings in the London Borough of Wandsworth
Pubs in the London Borough of Wandsworth